National Indian Association may refer to:

National Indian Association - British organisation concerned with women and education in India
Women's National Indian Association - American organisation concerned with Native Americans
Indian National Association - Organisation in India